is a Japanese voice actress affiliated with Mausu Promotion. Her major roles include Yuri Sakakibara in the Sakura Wars, Nami Amou and Nanami Sousuke in La Corda d'Oro, Nicola in Kyo Kara Maoh!, Maria Alucard in Tokyo Majin, and Hibiki Amawa (female) in I My Me! Strawberry Eggs.

Filmography

Anime

Film

Video games

Drama CD

Dubbing

Babs Seed in My Little Pony: Friendship Is Magic 
Dulcy the Dragon (also by Mayuko Aoki) in Sonic the Hedgehog

Anime soundtracks
 Flame of Recca Ending 2 ("Zutto Kimi no Soba de")

References

External links
 Official agency profile at Mausu Promotion 
 

1973 births
Living people
Japanese voice actresses
Voice actresses from Shizuoka Prefecture